Shaw Family Farms are historic family farms and a national historic district located near Wagram, Scotland County, North Carolina. The district encompasses 16 contributing buildings and 2 contributing structures.  They include three houses: The Dr. Daniel Shaw House, a large two-story, double-pile house with a dominant double tier gable portico built about 1885 with a Greek Revival interior; the Alexander Edwin Shaw House, a rambling one-story vernacular frame dwelling with an extensive Victorian wraparound porch also built about 1885; and the Dr. William Graham Shaw House, a one-story house of traditional local form, treated with a variety of simplified Queen Anne elements and built in 1900.  Also on the farms are a number of contributing agricultural outbuildings.

It was added to the National Register of Historic Places in 1983.

References

Farms on the National Register of Historic Places in North Carolina
Historic districts on the National Register of Historic Places in North Carolina
Greek Revival houses in North Carolina
Queen Anne architecture in North Carolina
Houses completed in 1885
Buildings and structures in Scotland County, North Carolina
National Register of Historic Places in Scotland County, North Carolina